BGC Partners is an American global financial services company based in New York City and London. Originally formed as part of the larger Cantor Fitzgerald organization, BGC Partners became its own entity in 2004.

History

1945–1990
In 1945, Bernard Gerald Cantor founded a brokerage service for inter-dealer fixed-income markets. The resulting company was B.G. Cantor and Company, which later became Cantor Fitzgerald.

In 1965 Cantor Fitzgerald established an Institutional Equities Sales and Trading Division, which offers large block trading to asset managers, pension funds, and portfolio managers. In 1983, Cantor Fitzgerald became the first firm to offer worldwide screen brokerage services in US Government securities.

1991–2001
In 1991, Howard Lutnick was named president of Cantor Fitzgerald, after having worked at the firm for the previous eight years. Lutnick placed a new emphasis on technological innovation at the company, and in 1996 led the development of eSpeed, which went public in 1999.

The September 11, 2001 attacks claimed 658 employees of Cantor Fitzgerald and eSpeed, whose headquarters were in the World Trade Center. In response to the attacks, BGC Partners and Cantor Fitzgerald pledged to donate 25% of their profits to families of deceased employees.

2004–present
BGC Partners was formed in 2004 when Cantor Fitzgerald spun out its voice brokerage business. The initials BGC standing for that company's founder, Bernard Gerald Cantor.

In April 2005, BGC Partners LP merged with Maxcor Financial Group Inc. to form BGC Partners.

In September 2005, BGC Partners held their first annual Charity Day event. The event featured Harry Carson, Boomer Esiason, and Mariano Rivera and raised money for the Cantor Fitzgerald Relief Fund among other charities.

In 2007, BGC Partners opened an office in Seoul, South Korea and became the first inter-dealer broker to open an office in Istanbul, Turkey.

In 2008, BGC Partners merged with eSpeed and becomes BGC Partners Inc.

In November 2009, BGC Partners won Asia Risk Magazine's first ever award for Technology Development.

In May 2012 the Financial Services Authority, Britain's financial regulator, announced its decision to prohibit Anthony Verrier (a senior executive at BGC) from performing any function in relation to any regulated activity in the financial services industry. The FSA stated it believes that Verrier is not a fit and proper person due to concerns over his honesty, integrity and reputation. Its decision followed a civil court ruling that Verrier led an unlawful poaching conspiracy against rival interdealer broker Tullett Prebon and did not tell the truth about it in court.

Also in May 2012 a story was published by the New York Daily News under the headline 'Cantor Fitzgerald VP was boss from hell, secretary says in suit' which reported on a lawsuit brought against the company by former employee Crystal Mitchell. Mitchell worked as an executive assistant to Michael Lampert at BGC USA, an affiliate of Cantor Fitzgerald, in March 2011. According to the suit filed by her lawyer David Harrison, her boss once threw a cup of tea at her because she hadn't removed the teabag. "The boiling hot liquid spilled on [Mitchell], burning her stomach and upper leg, and staining her clothes.” the suit said, adding that “Almost daily, Lampert humiliated and degraded Mitchell, yelling at her as if she was inferior and calling her: ‘stupid,’ ‘moron,’ ‘the dumbest person I ever met,’ ‘incompetent,’ and ‘idiot,’ ”. Elsewhere in the discrimination suit, she says she complained about the treatment to human resource managers — but her pleas for help were ignored.

In October 2012 the New York Post ran an article entitled 'Cantor, Moody's Dogfight' reporting on a 'feud' between the company and Moody's Investors Service. The article stated that Cantor Fitzgerald and Moody's had been feuding for months over differing opinions of Cantor's profitability. In July 2012 Cantor terminated its relationship with Moody's. In October 2012 the ratings agency dropped BGC's status to Ba2. In December 2012 Bloomberg reported that S&P cut Cantor to BBB- and left the rating for BGC Partners Inc., the company’s interdealer broker affiliate, unchanged at the lowest investment grade.

Two articles appeared in January 2013 written by Bloomberg journalist Zeke Faux. The first, dated January 8th was titled 'Cantor May Face Another Ratings Cut as Fitch Cites Slump' and quoted Mohak Rao, a Fitch analyst. Rao wrote in a report "Cantor’s institutional business and BGC’s financial brokerage business will remain challenged in the medium term because of lower trading volume”.

Two days later Zeke Faux published a second, much longer, article titled 'Cantor Growth Plan Sputters as 41% of Touted Hires Exit' citing that 41% of the 158 traders and bankers whose hirings Cantor announced in news releases since 2009 had left, according to industry records.

On April 1, 2013, NASDAQ OMX Group agreed to acquire an electronic Treasurys marketplace from brokerage firm BGC Partners Inc. in a cash-and-stock deal valued at as much as $1.23 billion. The sale caused BGC to see the biggest gain in stock prices since going public in December 1999. The assets sold to Nasdaq in this deal represented $100 million in sales in 2012, less than 6% of BGC's overall total.

On October 2, 2013 BGC's subsidiary BGC Derivative Markets, L.P. launched operations as a Swap Execution Facility (SEF), consistent with the derivatives trading regulations under the Dodd-Frank Act. This followed BGC receiving CFTC approval to operate a Swap Execution Facility in September 2013.

In February 2017 BGC bought London based Lloyd's insurance broker, Besso Ltd.

In January 2019 Ed Broking Ltd, another London headquartered Lloyd's insurance broker was added to the Group.

Management and directors 
 Howard Lutnick, chairman and chief executive officer 
 Sean Windeatt, chief operating officer and chief executive officer 
 Stephen Merkel, executive vice president, general counsel 
 Jason W. Hauf, chief financial officer 
 Steven Sadoff, chief information officer

Offices 
The company's global headquarters are in Midtown, New York City, while it also has an office in the Downtown Financial District. The company and its associated businesses also operate offices around the world:

North America 
 Chicago - 222 West Adams, Suite 1900, Suite 1900
 Mexico City (Remate Lince S.A.P.I. de C.V.) Vasco de Quiroga 2121 Santa Fe CDMX
 New York City - 499 Park Avenue, New York, NY 10022
 New York City - 1 Seaport Plaza / 199 Water Street, 19th Floor, New York, NY 10038
 Toronto (Freedom International Brokerage) - 181 University Avenue, Suite 1500, Toronto ON M5H 3M7

South America 
 Rio de Janeiro (BGC Liquidez DTVM Ltda.) - Av. Almirante Barroso, 52 - 23rd Floor, Centro, Rio de Janeiro, RJ - 20031-000
 São Paulo (BGC Liquidez DTVM Ltda.) - Av. Brigadeiro Faria Lima, 3144 - 7th Floor, Jardim Paulistano, São Paulo, SP - 01451-000

Europe 
 Copenhagen (BGC Brokers L.P.) - Bremerholm 1, 2nd floor, DK 1069 Copenhagen 
 Hamburg (Junge & Co. Versicherungsmakler GmbH) - Hohe Bleichen 11, 20354 Hamburg 
 Istanbul (BGC Partners Menkul Degerler A.S.) - Kanyon Ofis Blogu, Buyukdere cad.No:185, Kat:13 Levent/Istanbul
 London (BGC Brokers L.P.) - 5 Churchill Place, Canary Wharf, London E14 5RD
 London (ED Broking Group Limited) - 52 Leadenhall St, London EC3A 2EB 
 London (Besso Limited) -  8-11 Crescent, London, EC3N 2LY 
 Moscow (BGC Partners CIS, LLC.) - 4A floor, rooms 5-9, Sector A, Smolenskaya Square, 3, 121099, Moscow City, Russia
 Nyon (BGC Brokers L.P.) - Alfred Cortot 4, CH-1260 Nyon
 Paris (Aurel BGC) - 15-17 Rue Vivienne, 75002 Paris

Asia 
 Beijing (BGC Capital Markets Limited) - Unit Room 506, 5/F South Block Tower C, No.2 Kexueyuan South Road, Haidian District, Beijing 100190
 Dubai (BGC Brokers L.P. Dubai; MINT Partners Dubai) - Al Fattan Currency House, Tower 2, Level 12, DIFC, PO Box 482030, Dubai
 Hong Kong (BGC Securities) - Suite 6402-08, 64/F, Two International Finance Centre, 8 Finance Street, Central, Hong Kong
 Seoul (BGC Capital Markets and Foreign Exchange Broker Limited) - 10/F Seoul Finance Center, 84 Taepyungro 1-ka, Chung-ku, Seoul, South Korea 100-768
 Singapore (BGC Partners Limited; BGC Radix Energy L.P.; BGC Securities Limited)- 1 Temasek Avenue #22-01, Millenia Tower, Singapore 039192
 Tokyo (BGC Capital Markets, LLC; BGC Shoken Kaisha Limited)- Akasaka Biz Tower 38F, 5-3-1 Akasaka, Minato-ku, Tokyo 107-6338

Australia 
 Sydney (BGC Partners Pty Limited) - Level 24, 363 George Street, Sydney NSW 2000

Africa 
 Johannesburg - Selborne House, Fourways Golf Park, Roos Street, Fourways, 2191

Associated businesses 
 Aqua Equities, joint venture with Cantor spun out in 2007
 Aurel BGC, French investment subsidiary formed in 2008
 BGC Liquidez, Brazilian subsidiary acquired in 2009
 Freedom International Brokerage, Canadian affiliate
 MINT Partners, global brokerage acquired in 2010 
Newmark Knight Frank, global real estate services. In October 2011, BGC Partners acquired Newmark Knight Frank. Six months later, in April 2012, BGC Partners also bought commercial real estate firm, Grubb & Ellis.
 BGC Radix Energy, global energy traders, acquired in 2008.
 Smith Mack, a commercial real estate firm, acquired in January 2013. 
 Frederick Ross Co., a real estate brokerage firm, acquired in January 2013. 
 Sterling International Brokers Limited, a currency broker, acquired in February 2013.
 RP Martin, UK broker, acquired in 2014.s
 GFI Group, a New York-based leading intermediary and provider of trading technologies and support services to the global OTC and listed markets, acquired in January 2016. The group also included Kyte broking, Latium capital.
 Sunrise Brokers, an equity derivatives broker, acquired in December 2016.
 Ed Broking Group, a global reinsurance, wholesale and specialty insurance broker with their German marine insurance arm Junge & Co. Versicherungsmakler, acquired in 2019

Philanthropy

Global Charity Day 

BGC Charity Day was founded in 2005 to raise money for the Cantor Fitzgerald Relief Fund and other nonprofits as a way to honor the victims of 9/11. Each year on or near September 11, BGC Charity Day brings in celebrities, athletes and politicians alike to man their phones and speak with clients, with all revenue from the day being donated to charities of choice. The Charity Day event has also spread beyond New York to all of BGC Partners' international offices.

Hurricane Sandy relief 
When Hurricane Sandy hit the New York and New Jersey coasts in October 2012, damages quickly totaled in the billions, with thousands of family homes completely destroyed along beach properties. A Hurricane Sandy Family Relief Program was established and funded largely by BGC Partners and Cantor Fitgerald's Charity Day efforts. $10 million in the form of $1,000 debit cards were handed out to families whose homes were damaged in the storm. The eligible families were identified through nineteen schools located in areas hardest hit by the storm.

Cantor Fitzgerald Slacks On 9/11 Pledge, But Promises $10 Million To Sandy Relief

Oklahoma Tornado relief 
On May 20, 2013, a tornado struck Moore, Oklahoma, killing 24 people and injuring hundreds more. Two days later, Howard Lutnick appeared on the Piers Morgan Live TV show and pledged to donate $2 million to families affected by the tornado. The donation was given out in the form of $1,000 debit cards given out to area families.

Sponsorship 
In 2012 the company became the title sponsor of the Masters snooker tournament.

Notes

References

External links 

 
 Cantor Fitzgerald Relief Fund

American companies established in 2004
Companies listed on the Nasdaq
Financial services companies based in New York City
Financial services companies established in 2004